Saffery Champness is a firm of chartered accountants in the UK, with a turnover of over £100 million. The firm has nine offices across the UK as well as offshore. 

The firm act for clients across a variety of specialty sectors including private wealth, landed estates and rural businesses, not-for-profit, entrepreneurs, sports and entertainment, international and more.

Saffery Champness is a member firm of Nexia International, a worldwide network of accounting and consulting firms.

Matthew Burton is the firm's Managing Partner.

History

1855 – 1982 
Saffery Champness was founded in 1855 by Joseph John Saffery at London's Guildhall chambers.

In 1880, the Institute of Chartered Accountants in England and Wales (ICAEW) was formed. Joseph John Saffery was a founding member of the first council and its president between 1889 – 1891.

1982 – present 
On 1 July 1982, Safferys and Champness, Cowper & Co, founded by JH Champness, merged to practise as Saffery Champness.

In 1986, the international network SC International was founded by the firm. This went on to merge with Nexia International in 2007 to create a global provider of audit and advisory services.

In 2010, Jonathan Fox became the firm's Managing Partner – the first non-accountant to lead a top 20 firm.

On 1 October 2012, the firm announced the acquisition of the Film & TV Unit of RSM Tenon. The transaction of the 17-strong team enabled them to build their Sports and Entertainment Group.

In 2013, Saffery Champness was involved in developing and lobbying for the UK Tax Relief and were the advisers for the production's cultural test application. The Film & TV Unit contributed to preparing the groundwork for the tax relief, which supports the film, animation, high-end television and video games industries.

In May 2015, Rob Elliott became the firm's Managing Partner. Rob was previously the firm's Managing Partner from 2002–10 and has also served as the firm's Finance Partner.

The firm celebrated its 160th anniversary in 2015.

In 2016 the firm relocated its London office to 71 Queen Victoria Street in the heart of the City of London.

In 2017 it was announced that James Sykes had been elected to a four-year term as the new Chairman of the firm.

In 2018, Matthew Burton became the firm's Managing Partner.

In April 2019, the firm acquired Grant Thornton Ireland's Media & Entertainment Practice and opened a new Irish office located at 99 St Stephen's Green in central Dublin.

Saffery Champness added as many net new AIM audit clients as all the other 25 top auditors put together in the Q2 2020 AIM auditor rankings.

In May 2022, Saffery Champness registered fiduciaries acquired Cayman-based Holden Trust and established a Saffery Champness office in the Cayman Islands.

Locations 
Saffery Champness has nine offices in the UK in Bournemouth, Bristol, Edinburgh, Harrogate, High Wycombe, Inverness, London, Manchester and Peterborough. They also have offices in Geneva, Guernsey, Dubai, Dublin and Zurich.

References

External links 
Saffery Champness
Nexia International

1885 establishments in the United Kingdom
Accounting firms of the United Kingdom
Financial services companies based in the City of London
Macroeconomics consulting firms